Aglaia cumingiana is a species of plant in the family Meliaceae. It is found in Brunei, Malaysia, and the Philippines.

References

cumingiana
Vulnerable plants
Taxonomy articles created by Polbot
Taxa named by Nikolai Turczaninow